Isochorista parmiferana is a species of moth of the family Tortricidae. It is found in Australia, where it has been recorded from New South Wales.

The wingspan is about 12 mm. Adults have been recorded on wing in September, October and March.

References

Moths described in 1881
Archipini